Rauschs is an unincorporated community and coal town in  East Brunswick Township, Schuylkill County, Pennsylvania, United States. It was also called Rausch and is located along the east side of the Little Schuylkill River and on the north foot of Blue Mountain. It is served by the New Ringgold post office with the zip code of 17960.

References

Unincorporated communities in Schuylkill County, Pennsylvania
Coal towns in Pennsylvania
Unincorporated communities in Pennsylvania